Armstrong's Theatre of Today is a news and romantic drama radio program which was broadcast at noon on Saturdays by CBS Radio from October 4, 1941, to May 22, 1954. The 30-minute series was sponsored by the Armstrong Cork Company (Armstrong Quaker Rugs and Linoleum) and Cream of Wheat (1953-54).

The announcers were George Bryan and Tom Shirley. The program opened with Bryan reporting the news, followed by Hollywood film actors in original dramas. Ira Avery and Al Ward directed with Avery producing. James Rinaldi provided the special effects. Commercials were read by the Armstrong Quaker Girl (Elizabeth Reller, Julie Conway). 

Harold Levey was the musical director.

Stars over Hollywood, another anthology program, also began in 1941, and when Armstrong began it immediately followed Stars on the air. That combination "gave CBS the edge in the Saturday dramatic derby for thirteen years."

References

See also
Armstrong World Industries

American radio dramas
1941 radio programme debuts
1954 radio programme endings
CBS Radio programs
1940s American radio programs